Thayawthadangyi Kyun, also known as Elphinstone Island, is an island in the Mergui Archipelago, Burma.

Geography
Thayawthadangyi is irregular in shape, hilly and thickly wooded. It is part of the northern group of islands of the archipelago.

The highest points, both rising on the western part of the island are  Elphinstone Peak and  False Peak.

Nearby islands
Daung Kyun lies off Thayawthadangyi's southeastern shore.

References 

Mergui Archipelago
Tanintharyi Region